The Centre Colonels football team, historically also known as the Praying Colonels, represents Centre College in NCAA Division III competition. The Colonels currently play in the Southern Athletic Association (SAA), which was established in 2011. Before the establishment of the SAA, Centre played 50 seasons in the Southern Collegiate Athletic Conference (SCAC). Despite the school's small size (2008 enrollment of 1,215), the football team has historically had success and possesses a strong tradition. At the end of the 2008 season, the school ranked as the 12th winningest school in Division III with an all-time record of 509–374–37.

History
On April 9, 1880, a Centre College team traveled to Lexington to play against Transylvania University in the first football game south of the Ohio River. The Colonels lost that game, and a rematch at home later in the month, but it was the start of a long-running rivalry with their in-state opponent. The first officially recognized game of Centre and the University of Kentucky took place in 1891. In that series, the Colonels compiled a 20–13–2 record before the Kentucky athletic council decided to permanently drop Centre from their schedule after the 1929 season. 
From 1917 to 1924, Centre compiled a 57–8 record while playing against some of the best teams in the nation. The team was retroactively selected by Jeff Sagarin as co-national champion for the 1919 season. After the 1920 season, Centre faced Texas Christian (TCU) in the Fort Worth Classic. The Colonels convincingly routed them, 63–7.

The 1921 Centre–Harvard game resulted in one of the most shocking upsets in college football, with the Colonels winning, 6–0. The star of that game, back Alvin "Bo" McMillin, was twice named a consensus All-American, in 1919 and 1921. Center Red Weaver was named a consensus All-American alongside him in 1919. The Colonels finished the 1921 season undefeated, outscoring their opponents, 314–6. In the Dixie Classic, precursor to the modern Cotton Bowl Classic, Centre faced Texas A&M. Miscues contributed to the Colonels' defeat, 22–14.  This is also the game in which Texas A&M's 12th man tradition originated. In 1924 Centre defeated Georgia and Alabama and claims a southern title. As early as 1927, a writer noted that its glory days were short-lived as losses mounted and it fell out of the limelight.

Centre again found success during the 1950s. In 1951, the Colonels finished the season with a 5–1 record and were invited to play Northern Illinois State in the Corn Bowl. The invitation, however, was rejected by the school administration who wished to de-emphasize football. From 1954 to 1956, Centre compiled a sixteen-game winning streak. In 1955, the undefeated Colonels were again invited to a postseason game, the Tangerine Bowl, but once more declined.

In recent years, Centre has secured eight SCAC championships between 1980 and 2003. Jack "Teel" Bruner, a safety from 1982 to 1985, became the second Centre Colonel inducted into the College Football Hall of Fame. In 1984, he recorded five interceptions against Rose-Hulman, tying the all-time record.

In 2011, the Colonels' final SCAC season, they finished second in the conference, but received an at-large invitation to the NCAA tournament. The Colonels defeated Hampden–Sydney in the first round to earn their first Division III tournament win, and lost in the next round to traditional D-III powerhouse Mount Union.

The Colonels' 2014 season was arguably their most successful in decades. They won their first SAA championship and finished the regular season 10–0, marking the team's first unbeaten regular season since 1955 and only the third in school history. The season ended in the first round of the Division III playoffs against John Carroll.

Conference affiliations

 Independent (1880, 1894–1923)
 Southern Intercollegiate Athletic Association (1924–1941)
 Southern Collegiate Athletic Conference (1962–2011) 
 Southern Athletic Association (2012–present)

Championships

National championships
Centre won its lone national championship in 1919. Centre claims this championship.

Independent Southern championships

Conference championships

Individual achievements

Consensus All-Americans
Centre has three consensus All-America selections.

 Bo McMillin, B (1919, 1921)
 Red Weaver, C (1919)

College Football Hall of Fame

Two former Centre players have been inducted into the College Football Hall of Fame, located in Atlanta, Georgia.

References

External links

 
American football teams established in 1880
1880 establishments in Kentucky